The Expand Social Security Caucus is a congressional caucus in the United States House of Representatives and United States Senate, consisting of members that advocate for the expansion of Social Security. It has 19 members in the Senate and over 150 in the House.

According to Senate co-chair Bernie Sanders, the group was formed partly in response to President Donald Trump's recent claims that Democrats "want to destroy [your] Social Security".

Electoral results

Senate members

Current members

House members

Current members

Former members

References 

Social security in the United States
Ideological caucuses of the United States Congress
Democratic Party (United States) organizations
Progressive organizations in the United States
Organizations established in 2018
2018 establishments in the United States
Factions in the Democratic Party (United States)